A report is a document that presents information in an organized format for a specific audience and purpose. Although summaries of reports may be delivered orally, complete reports are almost always in the form of written documents.

Usage 
In modern business scenario, reports play a major role in the progress of business. Reports are the backbone to the thinking process of the establishment and they are responsible, to a great extent, in evolving an efficient or inefficient work environment.

The significance of the reports includes:
 Reports present adequate information on various aspects of the business.
 All the skills and the knowledge of the professionals are communicated through reports.
 Reports help the top line in decision making.
 A rule and balanced report also helps in problem solving.
 Reports communicate the planning, policies and other matters regarding an organization to the masses. News reports play the role of ombudsman and levy checks and balances on the establishment.

Attributes 
One of the most common formats for presenting reports is IMRAD—introduction, methods, results, and discussion. This structure, standard for the genre, mirrors traditional publication of scientific research and summons the ethos and credibility of that discipline. Reports are not required to follow this pattern and may use alternative methods such as the problem-solution format, wherein the author first lists an issue and then details what must be done to fix the problem. Transparency and a focus on quality are keys to writing a useful report. Accuracy is also important. Faulty numbers in a financial report could lead to disastrous consequences.

Standard elements 
Reports use features such as tables, graphics, pictures, voice, or specialized vocabulary in order to persuade a specific audience to undertake an action or inform the reader of the subject at hand. Some common elements of written reports include headings to indicate topics and help the reader locate relevant information quickly, and visual elements such as charts, tables and figures, which are useful for breaking up large sections of text and making complex issues more accessible. Lengthy written reports will almost always contain a table of contents, appendices, footnotes, and references. A bibliography or list of references will appear at the end of any credible report and citations are often included within the text itself. Complex terms are explained within the body of the report or listed as footnotes in order to make the report easier to follow. A short summary of the report's contents, called an abstract, may appear in the beginning so that the audience knows what the report will cover. Online reports often contain hyperlinks to internal or external sources as well.

Verbal reports differ from written reports in the minutiae of their format, but they still educate or advocate for a course of action. Quality reports will be well researched and the speaker will list their sources if at all possible.

Structure of a report 
A typical report would include the following sections in it:

 Title page
 Executive summary
 Table of contents
 Introduction
 Discussion or body
 Conclusion
 Recommendations
 Reference list
 Appendices.

Types 

Some examples of reports are:

 Annual reports
 Auditor's reports
 Book reports
 Bound report
 Retail report
 Census reports
 Credit reports
 Demographic reports
 Expense report
 Experience report
 Incident report
 Inspection reports
 Military reports
 Police reports
 Policy reports
 Informal reports
 Progress reports
 Investigative reports
 Technical or scientific reports
 Trip reports
 White papers
 Appraisal reports
 Workplace reports

See also 
 Customer relationship management
 Data quality
 Decision support system
 Enterprise application integration
 Enterprise resource planning
 Global Reporting Initiative
 Grey Literature International Steering Committee – International guidelines for the production of scientific and technical reports
 Management information system

References

Further reading 
 Blick, Ronald (2003). "Write!". Prentice Hall. .
 Gerson, Sharon and Gerson, Steven (2005). Technical Writing: Process and Product. Prentice-Hall. .
 Lannon, John (2007). Technical Communication. Longman. .